Woodrow Wilson Junior High School, located in Eugene, Oregon, United States, is listed on the National Register of Historic Places. The school was constructed in 1924 on four acres at 650 West 12th Avenue near Jefferson Street for the Eugene Public School System. Architect Frederick Manson White of Portland designed the 57,120 square-foot building to accommodate 840 students. White also designed the other school built that year in Eugene, Roosevelt Junior High on Agate Street. After it opened in September 1925, Wilson became a central part of middle school education in western Eugene. In 1953, the Wilson school was converted to an elementary school and renamed Lincoln Elementary School. Aspects of the building were altered to accommodate smaller students, such as lowered blackboards and bathroom fixtures. The original twenty classrooms were reduced to fourteen, creating larger interior spaces that included administrative offices. The library was made smaller, and a storeroom and kitchen were added. After the school was closed and vacated by the school district in 1987, the building was repurposed as the Lincoln School Condominiums.

See also
 National Register of Historic Places listings in Lane County, Oregon

References

1924 establishments in Oregon
1987 disestablishments in Oregon
Defunct schools in Oregon
Frederick Manson White buildings
National Register of Historic Places in Eugene, Oregon
Neoclassical architecture in Oregon
School buildings completed in 1924
School buildings on the National Register of Historic Places in Oregon